Eye was a parliamentary constituency, represented in the House of Commons of the Parliament of the United Kingdom, encompassing an area around the market town and civil parish of Eye, Suffolk.

History
Eye was once the smallest borough in the country, its claim based on the 1205 Charter of King John. The Charter was renewed in 1408, then many more times by successive monarchs. The error was confirmed by archivists in the 1950s, but borough status was not discontinued until 1974 after government reorganization when Eye became a parish but retained a Town Council, a Mayor and the insignia.

From 1571 to 1832, the Parliamentary Borough of Eye elected two Members of Parliament (MPs) by the bloc vote system of election. By the mid eighteenth century it tended to be seen a pocket borough of Earl Cornwallis who could nominate the two MPs. The Reform Act 1832 reduced its representation to one MP, elected by the first past the post system. The parliamentary borough was abolished under the Redistribution of Seats Act 1885, and was reconstituted as one of five single-member county divisions of the Parliamentary County of Suffolk, becoming a county constituency from the 1950 general election.

This in turn was abolished for the 1983 general election when western areas, comprising the majority, became part of the new county constituency of Central Suffolk, with eastern areas forming part of the new county constituency of Suffolk Coastal.

The seat's main claim to fame was that it was the smallest town to have a parliamentary constituency named after it as the town of Eye had only approximately 1500 voters in 1981. It had been mostly a Liberal seat until 1951, after which it became a safe Conservative seat.

Boundaries and boundary changes
1885–1918: The Municipal Borough of Eye, the Sessional Divisions of Framlingham, Hartismere, and Hoxne, and part of the Sessional Division of Blything.

Formed from parts of the abolished Eastern and Western Divisions of Suffolk and incorporating the abolished Parliamentary Borough of Eye. Apart from Eye, the main town was Saxmundham.

1918–1950: The Municipal Borough of Eye, the Urban Districts of Halesworth, Leiston-cum-Sizewell, Saxmundham, and Stowmarket, the Rural Districts of East Stow, Hartismere, and Hoxne, and parts of the Rural Districts of Blything and Plomesgate.

Gained southernmost part of the Lowestoft Division, including Halesworth, and a small area to the east from the abolished Stowmarket Division, including Stowmarket itself.

1950–1983: The Municipal Boroughs of Aldeburgh and Eye, the Urban Districts of Leiston-cum-Sizewell, Saxmundham, and Stowmarket, the Rural Districts of Blyth, Gipping, and Hartismere, and in the Rural District of Deben the civil parishes of Blaxhall, Boulge, Bredfield, Burgh, Campsey Ash, Charsfield, Chillesford, Clopton, Cretingham, Dallinghoo, Dallinghoo Wield, Debach, Eyke, Gedgrave, Grundisburgh, Hoo, Iken, Letheringham, Monewden, Orford, Otley, Pettistree, Rendlesham, Sudbourne, Swilland, Tunstall, Ufford, Wantisden, Wickham Market, and Witnesham.

Extended southwards to gain Aldeburgh and mainly rural areas from the northern part of the abolished Woodbridge Division of East Suffolk.  Area previously transferred from Lowestoft (including Halesworth) now returned.

Members of Parliament

Eye borough

MPs 1571–1660

MPs 1660–1832

MPs 1832–1885

Eye division of Suffolk

MPs 1885–1983

Elections

Elections in the 1830s

Sidney resigned, causing a by-election.

Elections in the 1840s

Elections in the 1850s

Elections in the 1860s

Kerrison resigned in order to contest the 1866 by-election in East Suffolk.

Elections in the 1870s 

Barrington was appointed Vice-Chamberlain of the Household, requiring a by-election.

Elections in the 1880s 

Bartlett was appointed a Civil Lord of the Admiralty, requiring a by-election.

Elections in the 1890s

Elections in the 1900s

Elections in the 1910s 

General Election 1914–15:

Another General Election was required to take place before the end of 1915. The political parties had been making preparations for an election to take place from 1914 and by the end of this year, the following candidates had been selected; 
Liberal: Harold Pearson
Unionist:

Elections in the 1920s

Elections in the 1930s

Elections in the 1940s 
General Election 1939–40:

Another General Election was required to take place before the end of 1940. The political parties had been making preparations for an election to take place from 1939 and by the end of this year, the following candidates had been selected; 
Liberal: Edgar Granville
Labour: Harry Leonard Self
British Union: Ronald Noah Creasy

Elections in the 1950s

Elections in the 1960s

Elections in the 1970s

See also
List of parliamentary constituencies in Suffolk

References

Parliamentary constituencies in Suffolk (historic)
Constituencies of the Parliament of the United Kingdom established in 1571
Constituencies of the Parliament of the United Kingdom disestablished in 1983
Mid Suffolk District
Eye, Suffolk